John Rolly Ross (March 1, 1899 – April 22, 1963) was a United States district judge of the United States District Court for the District of Nevada.

Education and career
Born in Boston, Massachusetts, Ross graduated from Lyon County High School, Nevada. He was in the United States Army in World War I and served in France. Upon return, he received an Artium Baccalaureus degree from the University of Nevada, Reno in 1923 and a Juris Doctor from Stanford Law School in 1926. He was in private practice from 1926 to 1954. He was district attorney of Lyon County from 1927 to 1929 and a city attorney of Yerington, Nevada from 1929 to 1939. He was the Republican State Chairman in 1934, and was city attorney of Carson City, Nevada from 1947 to 1951. He was a member of the Governor's Legislative Counsel in 1947, 1951, and 1953.

Federal judicial service

On May 3, 1954, Ross was nominated by President Dwight D. Eisenhower to a new seat on the United States District Court for the District of Nevada created by 68 Stat. 8. He was confirmed by the United States Senate on May 13, 1954, and received his commission on May 15, 1954. He served as Chief Judge from 1961 until his death on April 22, 1963.

References

Sources
 

1899 births
1963 deaths
District attorneys in Nevada
Judges of the United States District Court for the District of Nevada
United States district court judges appointed by Dwight D. Eisenhower
20th-century American judges
Stanford Law School alumni
University of Nevada, Reno alumni
United States Army soldiers
Lawyers from Boston
Nevada Republicans
Military personnel from Massachusetts
United States Army personnel of World War I
City and town attorneys in the United States